Biography of a Bachelor Girl is a 1935 American comedy film directed by Edward H. Griffith and written by Horace Jackson and Anita Loos. It is based upon the play, "Biography," by S. N. Behrman. The film stars Ann Harding, Robert Montgomery, Edward Everett Horton, Edward Arnold, Una Merkel and Charles Richman. It was released on January 4, 1935, by Metro-Goldwyn-Mayer.

Plot
Cynical and hard-bitten publisher Richard Kurt (Robert Montgomery) persuades free-spirited bohemian artist Marion Forsythe (Ann Harding) to write her memoirs, which he hopes will be salacious. Her old (and nearly forgotten) flame Leander Nolan (Edward Everett Horton)—she calls him Bunny—is now running for the Senate and fears embarrassment and political ruin. Spurred by his wealthy backer and prospective father-in-law, Nolan tries to halt publication of the book, clashing from the start with Kurt. To get Marion away from the distraction, Kurt takes her to a secluded cabin in Maine, where a romance develops between the two, despite the great differences in temperament, tolerance and ambition. The arrival of Nolan, his fiancée (Una Merkel), and her father brings matters to a head.

Cast 
 Ann Harding as Marion Forsythe
 Robert Montgomery as Richard "Dickie" Kurt
 Edward Everett Horton as Leander 'Bunny' Nolan
 Edward Arnold as Mr. "Feydie" Feydak
 Una Merkel as Slade Kinnicott
 Charles Richman as Mr. Orrin Kinnicott
 Greta Meyer as Minnie
 Willard Robertson as Grigsby
 Donald Meek as Mr. Irish

References

External links 
 
 
 
 

1935 films
American comedy films
1935 comedy films
Metro-Goldwyn-Mayer films
Films directed by Edward H. Griffith
Films scored by Herbert Stothart
American black-and-white films
1930s English-language films
1930s American films